Ipotești is a commune located in Suceava County, Bukovina, northeastern Romania. It is composed of three villages: namely Ipotești, Lisaura, and Tișăuți. The commune is primarily inhabited by Romanians.

Administration and local politics

Commune council 

The commune's current local council has the following political composition, according to the results of the 2020 Romanian local elections:

References 

Communes in Suceava County
Localities in Southern Bukovina